Guido Wilhelmus Imbens (born 3 September 1963) is a Dutch-American economist whose research concerns econometrics and statistics. He holds the Applied Econometrics Professorship in Economics at the Stanford Graduate School of Business at Stanford University, where he has taught since 2012. 

In 2021, Imbens was awarded half of the Nobel Memorial Prize in Economic Sciences jointly with Joshua Angrist "for their methodological contributions to the analysis of causal relationships." Their work focused on natural experiments, which can offer empirical data in contexts where controlled experimentation may be expensive, time-consuming, or unethical. In 1994 Imbens and Angrist introduced the local average treatment effect (LATE) framework, an influential mathematical methodology for reliably inferring causation from natural experiments that accounted for and defined the limitations of such inferences. Imbens' work with Angrist, together with the work of co-recipient David Card, is credited with catalyzing the "credibility revolution" in empirical microeconomics.

Early life and education
Guido Wilhelmus Imbens was born on 3 September 1963 in Geldrop, the Netherlands.  As a child, Imbens was an avid chess player. In a 2021 interview, Imbens connected his passion for econometrics to his childhood interest in the game.

In high school Imbens was introduced to the work of Dutch economist Jan Tinbergen. Influenced by Tinbergen's work, Imbens chose to study economics at Erasmus University Rotterdam, where Tinbergen had taught and established a program in economics. Imbens graduated with a Candidate's degree in Econometrics from Erasmus University Rotterdam in 1983. He subsequently obtained an M.Sc. degree with distinction in Economics and Econometrics from the University of Hull in Kingston upon Hull, UK in 1986.

In 1986, one of Imbens' mentors at the University of Hull, Anthony Lancaster, moved to Brown University in Providence, Rhode Island. Imbens followed Lancaster to Brown to pursue further graduate and doctoral studies. Imbens received an A.M. and a Ph.D. degree  in Economics from Brown in 1989 and 1991, respectively.

Career
Imbens has taught at Tilburg University (1989-1990), Harvard University (1990–97, 2007–12), the University of California, Los Angeles (1997–2001), and the University of California, Berkeley (2001–07). He specializes in econometrics, which are particular methods for drawing causal inference. He became the editor of Econometrica in 2019, with his term anticipated (as of 2022) to end in 2025. As of 2021, he is a professor of applied econometrics and economics at Stanford Graduate School of Business. He is also a senior fellow at the Stanford Institute for Economic Policy Research (SIEPR) and a professor of economics at the institute's School of Humanities and Sciences.

Imbens is a fellow of the Econometric Society (2001) and the American Academy of Arts and Sciences (2009). Imbens was elected to the Royal Netherlands Academy of Arts and Sciences as a foreign member in 2017. He was elected as a Fellow of the American Statistical Association in 2020.

Econometrics and work on causal relationships 
Working with fellow economists including Joshua Angrist and Alan Krueger, Imbens focused on developing methodologies and frameworks that help economists use a kind of real-life situations known as natural experiments to test hypotheses about causal relationships, such as the impact of additional years of school education on earnings. His frameworks for causal relationships study found use in multiple other fields including social and biomedical sciences. It provided researchers with tools to understand the limitations of real-world experiments, improving their ability to better understand the effects of field and experimental data based interventions.

In one of his earliest collaborations with Angrist, Imbens introduced a concept called Local Average Treatment Effect (LATE) to draw causal inference from observational data. In a 1994 Econometrica paper titled "Identification and Estimation of Local Average Treatment Effects", the pair employed the idea of natural experiments, where one studies the effects of key changes by using chance and randomization that naturally occur in the real world, instead of controlled conditions, which can be expensive, time-consuming, or even unethical. The paper and the model had significant impact on other research efforts across econometrics, statistics and other fields.

In one of the real-world applications of the model that would have implications for policymakers, Imbens partnered with statistician Donald Rubin and economist Bruce Sacerdote to study the impact of unearned earnings on labor supply. The group studied the implications of policy interventions such as Universal Basic Income or other federal and state wage assistance programs on citizens' willingness to participate in the labor force and the eventual impact on labor supply. To devise a natural experiment, the group studied the winners of the Massachusetts state lottery where the winners were paid incrementally over many years as opposed to a lump-sum payment. In doing so, the group was able to study the causal effects of guaranteed income. They found that winning the lottery had only a small impact on how much people worked. Winners of $80,000 a year for 20 years reduced their working hours somewhat, but winners of $15,000 a year for 20 years did not. Among unemployed persons who played the lottery, winners worked more than non-winners in the six years after playing.

Some of Imbens' work was summarized in a 2015 book co-written with American statistician Donald B. Rubin, Causal Inference for Statistics, Social, and Biomedical Sciences.

Around 2016, he (along with his wife Susan Athey) worked on using machine learning methods, particularly modifications to random forests called causal forests, to estimate heterogeneous treatment effects in causal inference models.

Nobel Memorial Prize in Economics

Imbens received the 2021 Nobel Memorial Prize in Economic Sciences along with fellow economists David Card and Joshua Angrist for their contributions toward methodologies for the analysis of causal relationships. In its press release, the Royal Swedish Academy of Sciences stated that they "have provided us with new insights about the labour market and shown what conclusions about cause and effect can be drawn from natural experiments. Their approach has spread to other fields and revolutionised empirical research."

Personal life 
Imbens has been married to fellow economist Susan Athey since 2002. Athey likewise teaches at the Stanford Graduate School of Business where she holds the Economics of Technology Professorship. The best man at Imbens and Athey's wedding was Joshua Angrist, with whom Imbens would share the Nobel prize 19 years later.

He holds dual citizenship in the United States and the Netherlands.

Honors and awards 

 Honorary Doctorate, University of St. Gallen, 2014
 Horace Mann Medal, Brown University Graduate School, 2017
 Nobel Memorial Prize in Economic Sciences, 2021
 Doctorate of Humane Letters, Brown University, 2022

Bibliography
 (with Lisa M. Lynch) Re-employment probabilities over the business cycle. Cambridge, MA: National Bureau of Economic Research, 1993.
 (with Richard H. Spady and Philip Johnson) Information Theoretic Approaches to Inference in Moment Condition Models. Cambridge, Mass.: National Bureau of Economic Research, 1995.
 (with Gary Chamberlain) Nonparametric applications of Bayesian inference. Cambridge, MA: National Bureau of Economic Research, 1996.
 (with Donald B. Rubin and Bruce Sacerdote) Estimating the effect of unearned income on labor supply, earnings, savings, and consumption : evidence from a survey of lottery players. Cambridge, MA: National Bureau of Economic Research, 1999.
 (with V. Joseph Hotz and Jacob Alex Klerman) The long-term gains from GAIN : a re-analysis of the impacts of the California GAIN Program. Cambridge, MA: National Bureau of Economic Research, 2000.
 (with Thomas Lemieux) Regression discontinuity designs: a guide to practice. Cambridge, Mass. : National Bureau of Economic Research, 2007.
 (with Jeffrey M. Wooldridge) Recent Developments in the Econometrics of Program Evaluation. Cambridge, Mass. : National Bureau of Economic Research, 2008.
 (with Karthik Kalyanaraman) Optimal bandwidth choice for the regression discontinuity estimator. Cambridge, Mass.: National Bureau of Economic Research, 2009.
 (with Alberto Abadie) A martingale representation for matching estimators. Cambridge, Mass.: National Bureau of Economic Research, 2009.

References

External links 

 Website at Stanford University
 
 

People from Geldrop
1963 births
Dutch Nobel laureates
21st-century American economists
Dutch emigrants to the United States
Brown University alumni
Erasmus University Rotterdam alumni
Fellows of the American Academy of Arts and Sciences
Fellows of the American Statistical Association
Fellows of the Econometric Society
Living people
Members of the Royal Netherlands Academy of Arts and Sciences
Microeconometricians
Nobel laureates in Economics
Stanford University Department of Economics faculty
Stanford University Graduate School of Business faculty
Dutch economists